Shermanology is a duo of Dutch EDM artists from Curaçao. Consisting of brother Andy Sherman and sister Dorothy Sherman, it was formed in 2009. Both siblings are DJs, singers, and producers.

Discography

Charting singles

Extended plays

Singles

References

Notes
 A  Did not enter the Ultratop 50, but peaked on the Dance chart.
 B  Did not enter the Ultratop 50, but peaked on the Flemish Ultratip chart.
 C  Did not enter the Ultratop 50, but peaked on the Walloon Ultratip chart.
 D  Did not enter the Ultratop 50, but peaked on the Dance Bubbling Under chart.

Sources

External links
Official website

Dutch DJs
Dutch electronic music groups
Dutch house music groups
Dutch musical trios
Dutch house musicians
Spinnin' Records artists
Progressive house musicians
Revealed Recordings artists
21st-century Dutch singers
Sibling musical trios
Electronic dance music DJs